= Floral Terranes =

American vintner

Floral Terranes is a Long Island, New York, vintner that makes wines and ciders from foraged fruits.
